Robert A. Miller may refer to:

Robert A. Miller (judge), American judge in South Dakota
Robert A. Miller (Oregon politician) (1854–1941), American politician in Oregon
Robert A. Miller (producer), American film producer, see Focus (2001 film)

See also
Robert Miller (disambiguation)